Kevin Sharpe may refer to:

 Kevin Sharpe (historian) (1949–2011), historian
 Kevin J. Sharpe (1950–2008), mathematician and theologian

See also 
 Kevin Sharp (disambiguation)